The Sony Xperia M is an Android 4.1/4.2/4.3 Jelly Bean OS smartphone from Sony which was launched in August 2013.

Features

Hardware
The Xperia M has a 4-inch TFT Capacitive touchscreen display, a 1 GHz Dual-core Snapdragon S4 Plus processor, a 5 mega-pixel HD Camera, 1 GB of RAM, and a total 4 GB of internal storage which can be extended by a microSD/HC card up to 32 GB.

Software
The Xperia M  is also available in a dual SIM variant as Xperia M Dual. Android 4.3 Jelly Bean OS update has been released for both - the Sony Xperia M and the Sony Xperia M Dual.

This phone also features stylish removable back covers with different colors like black, purple, light green and white. This is the cheapest PlayStation certified phone.

Variants

Android KitKat Official Update Petition 
From 3 August 2014 onwards Sony Xperia M users are signing a petition for Android Kitkat official update for Xperia M.

References 

8. Sony To Update Xperia M To Android 4.3 15.4.A.1.9 Firmware pcnexus.net (2014-06-02). Retrieved 2014-06-11.

9. Sony Xperia M Specs and The Latest Firmware Updates androidne.ws (2014-04-16. Retrieved 2015-01-29).

External links 
 Xperia M white paper (Sony official)
 Xperia M dual white paper (Sony official)

Android (operating system) devices
Mobile phones introduced in 2013
Discontinued smartphones
Sony smartphones